The Xiaomi Mi Note2 is a smartphone developed by Xiaomi Inc. It is part of Xiaomi's high-end big format smartphone line, the Mi Note Series and was released in November 2016.

Specifications

References

External links

 Xiaomi Website

Phablets
Mobile phones introduced in 2016
Mobile phones with 4K video recording
Mobile phones with infrared transmitter
Discontinued flagship smartphones
Xiaomi smartphones